John Carlo Abrugar Santos is a Filipino actor, best known for his role in the television series Till I Met You as Alejandro "Ali" Nicolas.

Early life
Santos was born on November 19, 1988 in Pampanga, Philippines. He is one of the two children of Edwin Santos, a seaman, and Elizabeth Gutierrez, an OFW, and has a younger sister named Janine.

Acting career
Santos studied Theater Arts at the University of the Philippines Diliman where he began his acting career appearing in plays by Dulaang UP. Few years later, before finishing his thesis at UP, he got accepted to work at Hong Kong Disneyland and at Universal Studios Singapore as a singer and dancer. He then flew to New York City to study musical theater at the Circle in the Square Theatre School. In the middle of his first year, he decided to come back home to the Philippines to pursue a career in acting.

Personal life
Santos revealed that he is now married to his high school crush, Shyleena Herrera in September 2019, and that he is now a father to a baby girl.

Filmography

Theater

Movies

Television/Digital

References

University of the Philippines alumni
Bicolano actors
1988 births
Living people
Filipino male film actors
People from Albay
Actors from Pampanga
Filipino male stage actors
Filipino male television actors
Viva Artists Agency
GMA Network personalities
ABS-CBN personalities